The Hawaii State Foundation on Culture and the Arts was established by the Hawaii State Legislature in 1965 to "promote, perpetuate, preserve, and encourage culture and the arts, history and the humanities as central to the quality of life of the people of Hawaii". It allowed Hawaii to receive federal grants from the National Endowment for the Arts.

In 1967, the Hawaii State Legislature enacted the Art in State Buildings Law, to be administered by the foundation. It mandated that 1% of the construction costs of new state buildings be set aside to purchase art. Hawaii thus became the first state in the United States with a Percent for Art law.

In 1970, the foundation and the state Department of Education jointly established the Artists in the Schools Program, making Hawaii the first state to establish a statewide partnership between schools and professional artists.

In 1989, the Art for State Buildings Law was expanded to establish the Works of Art Special Fund, a permanent fund for the purchase of art, also managed by the foundation.

In the fall of 2002, the Hawaii State Art Museum opened in the No. 1 Capitol District Building, at 250 South Hotel Street in Honolulu, where the Foundation's offices are also located.

References
 Yoshihara, Lisa A., Collective Visions, 1967-1997, An Exhibition Celebrating the 30th Anniversary of the State Foundation on Culture and the Arts, Art in Public Places Program, Presented at the Honolulu Academy of Arts, September 3-October 12, 1997, Honolulu, State Foundation on Culture and the Arts, 1997.

Footnotes

Arts councils of the United States
Great Society programs
National Endowment for the Arts
Hawaii art
State agencies of Hawaii
Arts foundations based in the United States
Arts organizations based in Hawaii
Government agencies established in 1965
1965 establishments in Hawaii